Paul Lücke (13 November 1914 – 10 August 1976) was a German politician and civil servant. He served as Germany's Federal Minister of the Interior from 1965–1968.

Lücke was a member of the Christian Democratic Union since the party's foundation in 1945. In the 1949 election he gained a seat in the inaugural Bundestag, which he held until 1972. Following the 1965 election, Lücke was appointed Minister of the Interior by Ludwig Erhard.

1914 births
1976 deaths
People from Oberbergischer Kreis
People from the Rhine Province
Members of the Bundestag for North Rhine-Westphalia
Members of the Bundestag 1969–1972
Members of the Bundestag 1965–1969
Members of the Bundestag 1961–1965
Members of the Bundestag 1957–1961
Members of the Bundestag 1953–1957
Members of the Bundestag 1949–1953
Interior ministers of Germany
Grand Crosses 1st class of the Order of Merit of the Federal Republic of Germany
Knights of the Holy Sepulchre
Members of the Bundestag for the Christian Democratic Union of Germany